The Chorzów Factory case was a case heard before the Permanent Court of International Justice in 1927. It was an early authority in international law that established a number of precedents in International Law.

Background
In the Upper Silesia plebiscite a majority of 31,864 voters voted to remain in Germany while 10,764 votes were given for Poland. Following three Silesian uprisings, the eastern part of Upper Silesia, including Chorzów and Królewska Huta, was separated from Germany and awarded to Poland in 1922. Migrations of people followed. Because of its strategic value, the case of the nitrogen factory Oberschlesische Stickstoffwerke was argued for years before the Permanent Court of International Justice, finally setting some new legal precedences on what is "just" in international relations.

Significance
The Court held that: 
 A State is held responsible for expropriation of alien property
 Under International Law, a nation is responsible for acts of Government organs or officers. 
 It is a general principle of international law that reparation is to be made for violations of international law. Regarding this, the PCIJ held: "reparation must, as far as possible, wipe out all the consequences of the illegal act and reestablish the situation which would, in all probability, have existed if that act had not been committed". The reparation should thereby consist of a restitution in kind, or if this is impossible, the payment of a sum that corresponds to the value as compensation.

See also
Chorzów#In Poland (1922–1939)

References

Permanent Court of International Justice cases